HMS Port Napier (M32) was a minelayer of the British Royal Navy during World War II, which was destroyed on 27 November 1940 in Loch Alsh, Scotland, by an explosion following an engine room fire.

Ship history
The ship was under construction at the Swan Hunter and Wigham Richardson Ltd. shipyard in Wallsend for the Port Line when she was requisitioned by the Royal Navy for conversion into a mine-laying vessel. The ship was clad in  armour plate, and her cargo holds were adapted to carry up to 600 naval mines. She was also armed with two  guns, two  2-pounder guns and four 20 mm guns for anti-aircraft defence. She was launched on 23 April 1940, commissioned on 12 June 1940, and joined the 1st Minelaying Squadron based at Kyle of Lochalsh in western Scotland.

Sinking
On 26 November 1940 Port Napier was loaded with mines in preparation for an operation. Each of the 550 mines aboard were fitted with their detonators ready for deployment. She also had 6,000 4-inch shells in her magazine, as well as 40 and 20 mm ammunition. Unfortunately that evening a strong gale blew up and the Port Napier dragged her anchors. Her propellers became fouled in the anchor chains of a collier and the two ships drifted into shallow water and grounded. The next day, while the rest of the squadron sailed on their minelaying operation, the two ships were separated and the Port Napier commenced fuelling. A fire broke out in the engine room and while most of the crew abandoned ship a small party remained behind to remove the detonators from the mines before abandoning the ship.

Because of the risk of an explosion the ship was towed out into the loch and set adrift, while the residents of Kyle were ordered to evacuate the village, and all shipping left the port. As the fire seemed to be dying down, another party of volunteers boarded. They found that the decks were red-hot and buckling, but managed to jettison some mines from the stern chutes, before being forced to abandon the ship again. They had scarcely cleared the ship when two distinct explosions occurred, followed moments later by a huge explosion that caused the Port Napier to roll over and sink, resting on her starboard side in seventy feet of water. A survey by Royal Navy divers found that the bows and stern were reasonably intact, but a  section of the port side had been blown out. The wreck was abandoned as a total loss. In 1944 sections of steel plating from the port side were removed for use in other ships but the unexploded mines and 4-inch ammunition were not recovered until 1950.

See also

References

1940 ships
Minelayers of the Royal Navy
World War II shipwrecks in the Atlantic Ocean
Maritime incidents in November 1940
Wreck diving sites in Scotland
Ships built by Swan Hunter
1940 in Scotland
Ships sunk by non-combat internal explosions